The RIT Tigers men's ice hockey team is a collegiate ice hockey team representing the Rochester Institute of Technology in suburban Rochester, New York, United States. The school's men's team competes in the Division I Atlantic Hockey conference. The team has won two national championships, one each at the Division II and Division III levels. It lost in the semifinals of the Division I "Frozen Four" in 2010.

History

Founding, Division II and Division III 

In the fall of 1957, RIT student Jack Trickey founded the Monroe County Amateur Hockey (MCAHA) Association. A group of RIT students made up the majority of one of the teams. In 1958, the RIT Hockey Club was founded, and competed in the MCAHA until the league folded in 1960. The RIT hockey team continued to play against junior varsity and club teams. The RIT student council and athletic committee recommended that hockey be added to the athletic program, and men's hockey later became a varsity sport. The team competed at the Division II and III level for several years, winning a national championship in Division II (1983) and another in Division III (1985), before moving up to Division I in 2005–2006.

NCAA Division I 
In their first year (2005–2006) in the Atlantic Hockey Association, the Tigers won the regular-season title, and went on to win two more in the next three years. They were ineligible to compete in the playoffs until the 2007–2008 season. In the 2007–2008 season, the Tigers played in the Mariucci classic in which they stunned the number-12-ranked Minnesota Golden Gophers 4–3 but fell to number-14-ranked Boston College 6–0. During the playoffs, they swept Holy Cross but were shut out in the first round of the AHA Tournament 5–0 by the Air Force Falcons, who were without their Hobey Baker finalist Eric Ehn. In the 2008–2009 season, the Tigers played some of their best regular-season hockey (notably an 11-game win streak from December 6 to January 25). They met Holy Cross again in the playoffs and won the series 2–1 but fell in the AHA Tournament to the Mercyhurst Lakers 5–4 in overtime. Highlights of the game include Mercyhurst overcoming a 3–1 deficit and the Tigers tying the game with under a minute left. In the 2009–10 season, their most successful season to date, the Tigers made a historic run all the way to the 2010 NCAA Frozen Four, sweeping Connecticut in the first round and winning the AHA Tournament by beating the Canisius Golden Griffins as well as the Sacred Heart Pioneers to advance to the NCAA tournament as the conference's autobid. The Tigers stunned the Denver Pioneers 2–1 and then finished off the University of New Hampshire Wildcats 6–2 in the east regional in Albany, New York, where they advanced to the Frozen Four. The team's run came to an end in the national semifinals, where they fell to the University of Wisconsin Badgers, 8–1.

In the 2010–2011 season, the Tigers played in the Maverick stampede but lost both their games against number-4-ranked St. Cloud State and the University of Nebraska–Omaha. The Tigers won yet another regular season title and made it all the way to the AHA championship game, where they fell to the Air Force Falcons by a score of 1–0. Air Force goaltender Jason Torf made 40 saves in the contest. In the 2011–2012 season, the Tigers struggled early on, but bounced back in the second half of the season, eliminating the Bentley Falcons after falling behind 1–0 in the first round series of the Atlantic Hockey playoffs, but prevailing in their next two games. They advanced again to the AHA championship game where they eliminated Niagara in overtime but fell, yet again, to the Air Force Falcons, getting shut out 4–0. The Tigers struggled over the next two seasons, as they finished 2012–2013 with a record of 15–18–5, their first losing record since joining Atlantic Hockey. This was also the first time they were unable to advance to the Atlantic Hockey semifinals at Blue Cross Arena, as they defeated American International College in the first round, but were swept by the Niagara Purple Eagles in the second round, losing in overtime in the second game. The following year (2013–2014), the Tigers played their final season at their home ice rink, Frank Ritter Memorial Ice Arena. The Tigers only won 6 out of 16 games at their home arena. Although they struggled that season, the Tigers participated in the "Frozen Frontier," a 10-day hockey festival at Rochester's Frontier Field outdoor baseball stadium. The Tigers took on their AHA rivals, the Niagara University Purple Eagles on December 14. The teams skated to a 2–2 tie in a snow storm and 16-degree temperatures. In their final game at Ritter Arena, the Tigers defeated their long time AHA rival, the Canisius College Golden Griffins 3–1. In the playoffs, the Tigers won the first game in overtime against Holy Cross before getting blown away in game two by a score of 5–1. In the deciding game, The Tigers led 2–0 but Holy Cross came from behind to tie the game in the second period, forcing overtime where they completed the comeback.

The Tigers moved into the 4,300-seat Gene Polisseni Center for the 2014–15 season. Their first season in the Polisseni Center saw the Tigers finish with a 20–15–5 overall record. They played in the Mariucci classic, losing both games against number-9-ranked Massachusetts–Lowell and number-8-ranked Minnesota. In the playoffs, they swept the Air Force Falcons in the second round after receiving a bye in the first round. The Tigers went on to defeat Canisius in the semifinals of the AHA Tournament by a score of 2–1 and the Meryhurst Lakers in the championship game by a score of 5–1 to win the Atlantic Hockey championship and advance to the NCAA Division I tournament for the second time in program history. The Tigers knocked off the Minnesota State Mavericks in the first round of the NCAA tournament 2–1, becoming the first #16 seed to defeat the top overall seed since the 16-team format was implemented in 2003. There would be no repeat, however, of the 2009–2010 run to the Frozen Four as the Tigers fell to the University of Nebraska Omaha Mavericks in the following round by a score of 4–0, ending their playoff run. In the 2015–16 season, the Tigers lost home ice in the first round to Mercyhurst as they were swept in their last two games of the regular season on home ice; however, the Tigers returned the favor in the postseason by sweeping the Lakers on the road. The Tigers once again were in the AHA tournament and faced the Air Force Falcons once again. The Tigers trailed 1–0 heading into the third and it would appear that they were headed to another shutout loss, but Andrew Miller scored with under 3 minutes left in the third to even the score. In overtime, the Tigers completed their comeback winning 2–1. The Tigers would then claim the Atlantic Hockey championship once again, convincingly defeating the Robert Morris Colonials by a score of 7–4, to advance to the NCAA Division 1 tournament for the second consecutive season. The team's playoff run ended in the first round of the east regional in Albany, New York by the first-ranked Quinnipiac Bobcats by a score of 4–0. The 2016–2017 season was a down year for the Tigers as they flirted with the .500 mark within their conference and were unable to defeat any non-conference teams. They faced Niagara in the first round of the playoffs losing a close one 5–4 in game 1 but shutting them out 5–0 in game 2 setting the stage for the deciding game 3. They were unable to complete the comeback as the Purple Eagles ended the Tigers' season winning 4–1.

In the 2017–2018 season, the Tigers started the season with their first game at Blue Cross Arena for Brick City weekend against the number-14th-ranked Northeastern University. It was the first meeting between these two schools. RIT jumped out to a 3–0 lead only to see Northeastern comeback and tie it. The Tigers performed well during the first half of the season but slumped during the second half. The Tigers finished with an overall record of 14–18–2 and a 13–14–1 for 27 points within their conference. Junior Erik Brown set a new school record with 28 goals during the season (including exhibition games) and also led the entire Atlantic Hockey Conference. His 28 goals was also 2nd overall in Division I hockey. In the playoffs, the Tigers faced the Sacred Heart Pioneers. Both teams split the first two games with both games heading to overtime. The Tigers prevailed in Game 1 scoring quickly in overtime to take a 1–0 series lead. The Pioneers prevailed in Game 2 after tying the game late in the third and finally ending it during triple overtime (the longest game in program history). In the deciding game, the Pioneers jumped out to a 2–0 lead early in the first and held the fort the rest of the way to clinch the series concluding the Tigers' season.

The Tigers finished the 2018–2019 with a record (17–17–4) and played the Arizona State Sun Devils for the first time. Despite the Sun Devils recently moving into Division 1, the Tigers got swept on home ice. In the playoffs, they faced Sacred Heart. They split the first two games with lopsided results (9–4 loss in Game 1 and a 7–3 win in Game 2) before edging them out in Game 3 with a 3–1 victory. The Tigers would then face the Niagara Purple Eagles in the next round. The game was intense with the goalies stealing the show. After regulation ended with no goals the game was decided in overtime where Niagara scored 7:03 into extra time to win 1–0.

The 2019–2020 season saw the Tigers play in the Icebreaker tournament in Ohio with a pair of games against Coach Wayne Wilson's and Associate Head Coach Brian Hills' Alma mater, the Bowling Green State Falcons as well as the Ohio State University Buckeyes. RIT prevailed against the Falcons in overtime (3–2) but fell to the Buckeyes (3–1). The Tigers had their ups and downs during the season but play was disrupted throughout the league when the COVID 19 pandemic cancelled the playoffs.

During the off-season, the school was debating whether or not to hold a season for the 2020–2021 season. On November 10, 2020, the school decided to cancel the season due to the pandemic. This prompted the team to issue a statement on Twitter showing an inconsistency (RIT plans to have a 12% increase in in-person learning next semester) as well as the fact that the season was to start in between semesters creating a comfortable bubble. Seven days later, the school reconsidered and declared that the season was set to move forward. The season got underway November 27 against Clarkson with RIT coming out victorious 8–5 in front of zero fans. This season also marked the debut of the Long Island University Sharks which RIT hosted and split the series. RIT finished the abridged season with a record of 9–9–2 and made an early exit from the playoffs getting swept by Canisius.

The 2022-23 season saw the Tigers win their first Atlantic Hockey Association Regular Season Championship since the 2010-11 season. The Tigers began the year strong, with highlights including their 8-5 defeat of Union during the Brick City Homecoming Game (also the team's first victory over the Dutchmen), and an 8-game win streak. As a result of their strong play, the Tigers found themselves nationally ranked in both the USCHO Poll and the USA Today Hockey Poll (peaking at #18 in both). However, the end of the regular season saw the Tigers slide, dropping out of the USCHO and USA Today rankings and winning only 4 of their final 9 contests. Despite this, the Tigers finished with a record of 22-11-1 (18-7-1 in conference play), their most wins since their 2009-10 season, and clinched the first seed in the Atlantic Hockey Playoffs.

Season-by-season results

Brick City Homecoming game results 
The Brick City Homecoming game is RIT's annual homecoming game that takes place at the Blue Cross Arena in downtown Rochester. The game is part of Brick City Homecoming and Family Weekend, and typically draws at or near a sellout crowd.

Records vs. current Atlantic Hockey teams 
As of the completion of 2022–23 season

Head coaches
As of the completion of 2022–23 season

Current Staff
Head coach: Wayne Wilson
Associate head coach: Brian Hills
Assistant coach: Dave Insalaco
Volunteer goaltending coach: Shane Madolora
Hockey operations director: Bethany Schlegel
Equipment manager: Stephen Henchen
Student manager: Spencer Szachara
Strength coach: Nate VanKouwenberg

NCAA tournament appearances

Division I

Statistical leaders
Source:

Career points leaders

Career goaltending leaders

GP = Games played; Min = Minutes played; W = Wins; L = Losses; T = Ties; GA = Goals against; SO = Shutouts; SV% = Save percentage; GAA = Goals against average

Minimum 30 games

Statistics current through the end of the 2022–23 regular season.

Players

Current roster
As of September 5, 2022.

Awards and honors

NCAA

Individual awards

Edward Jeremiah Award
 Wayne Wilson: 2001

Spencer Penrose Award
 Wayne Wilson: 2010

Division I All-Americans
AHCA Second Team All-Americans

2014–15: Matt Garbowsky, F
2020–21: Will Calverley, F

Division II All-Americans

First Team All-Americans
1983–84: Dave Burkholder, G; Chris Johnstone, F

Second Team All-Americans
1983–84: B. J. Hull, D

Division III All-Americans
First Team All-Americans

1984–85: Blaise MacDonald, D
1988–89: Scott Brown, F
1990–91: Bill Gall, D
1993–94: Jay Murphy, F
1995–96: Chris Maybury, F
1996–97: Steve Toll, F
1998–99: Jerry Galway, D; Pat Staerker, F
2000–01: Tyler Euverman, D; Jerry Galway, D; Derek Hahn, F; Pete Bournazakis, F
2001–02: Jerry Galway, D
2002–03: Mike Bournazakis, F

Second Team All-Americans

1984–85: Chris Johnstone, F
1985–86: John Hawkins, D
1988–89: Tim Cordik, D
1989–90: Chris Palmer, F
1994–95: Chris Maybury, F
1995–96: Adam French, D
1996–97: Jamie Morris, G; Brian Cossette, D
1997–98: Pat Staerker, F
1999–00: Pat Staerker, F
2003–04: Mike Tarantino, F

ECAC 2

Individual awards

Rookie of the Year

Ron Kerr: 1979
Chris Johnstone: 1982
B. J. Hull: 1983
Ritchie Herbert: 1984

All-Conference Teams
First Team All-ECAC 2

1981–82: Dave Burkholder, G; Jim Larouche, D
1982–83: Dave Burkholder, G; Chris Johnstone, F
1983–84: Dave Burkholder, G; B. J. Hull, D; Chris Johnstone, F

Second Team All-ECAC 2

1981–82: Chris Johnstone, F

ECAC West

Individual awards

Player of the Year
John Hawkins: 1986
Scott McNair: 1993
Jay Murphy: 1994
Pat Staerker: 1999, 2000
Jerry Galway: 2002
Mike Tarantino: 2004

Rookie of the Year
Scott Brown: 1986
Fred Abraham: 1988
Steve Toll: 1995
Jamie Morris: 1996
Pete Bournazakis: 1998
Mike Bournazakis: 2000
Mike Tarantino: 2001
Tristan Fairbarn: 2004

Goaltender of the Year
Tyler Euverman: 2001

Coach of the Year
Wayne Wilson: 2000, 2001, 2002

All-Conference teams
First Team All-ECAC West

1984–85: Blaise MacDonald, D; Chris Johnstone, F
1985–86: John Hawkins, D; Ritchie Herbert, F
1986–87: Ritchie Herbert, F
1987–88: Scott Brown, F
1988–89: Scott Brown, F
1989–90: Tim Cordick, D; Chris Palmer, F
1990–91: Bill Gall, D
1993–94: Kyle O'Brien, D
1995–96: Jamie Morris, G; Adam French, D; Chris Maybury, F
1996–97: Jamie Morris, G; Kelly Morel, D; Steve Toll, F
1997–98: Jamie Morris, G; Pete Bournazakis, F; Pat Staerker, F
1998–99: Jerry Galway, D; Luke Murphy, F
2000–01: Tyler Euverman, G; Jerry Galway, D; Pete Bournazakis, F; Mike Bournazakis, F; Derek Hahn, F
2001–02: Jerry Galway, D; Mike Bournazakis, F
2002–03: Ryan Francke, D; Mike Bournazakis, F
2003–04: Ryan Francke, D; Mike Tarantino, F
2004–05: Marc Hyman, D

Second Team All-ECAC West

1987–88: Tim Cordick, D
1988–89: Fred Abraham, G; Tim Cordick, D
1990–91: Steve Mirabile, F
1991–92: Tom Masaschi, F
2000–01: Ryan Fairbarn, D
2001–02: Tyler Euverman, G; Ryan Fairbarn, D; Mike Tarantino, F
2002–03: Tyler Euverman, G; Ryan Fairbarn, D; Mike Tarantino, F
2003–04: George Eliopolous, G; Ryan Fairbarn, D; Darren Doherty, F
2004–05: Jason Chafe, F

All-ECAC West Rookie Team

2000–01: Rob Boope, G; Ryan Fairbarn, D; Matt Moore, D; Mike Tarantino, F
2001–02: Roberto Orofiamma, F
2002–03: Darren Doherty, F
2003–04: Brad Harris, F; Tristan Fairbarn, F
2004–05: Simon Lambert, F

Atlantic Hockey

Individual awards

Player of the Year
Matt Garbowsky: 2015
Will Calverley: 2021
Carter Wilkie: 2023

Rookie of the Year
Al Mazur: 2007
Christopher Tanev: 2010
Adam Brubacher: 2017
Carter Wilkie: 2022

Best Defensive Forward
Matt Garbowsky: 2015
Will Calverley: 2021
Cody Laskosky: 2023

Best Defenseman
Dan Ringwald: 2010
Chase Norrish: 2016
Aiden Hansen-Bukata: 2023

Individual Sportsmanship Award
Mark Cornacchia: 2012

Regular Season Goaltending Award
Louis Menard: 2007
Jared DeMichiel: 2010
Shane Madolora: 2011

Regular Season Scoring Trophy
Simon Lambert: 2008
Matt Garbowsky: 2015
Will Calverley: 2021

Coach of the Year
Wayne Wilson: 2023

Most Valuable Player in Tournament
Cameron Burt: 2010
Matt Garbowsky: 2015
Myles Powell: 2016

All-Conference teams
First Team All-Atlantic Hockey

2007–08: Dan Ringwald, D; Simon Lambert, F
2008–09: Dan Ringwald, D; Brennan Sarazin, F
2009–10: Jared DeMichiel, G; Dan Ringwald, D
2010–11: Shane Madolora, G
2011–12: Shane Madolora, G
2012–13: Chris Saracino, D
2014–15: Matt Garbowsky, F
2015–16: Chase Norrish, D
2017–18: Erik Brown, F
2020–21: Dan Willett, D; Will Calverley, F
2021–22: Will Calverley, F
2022–23: Tommy Scarfone, G; Gianfranco Cassaro, D; Aiden Hansen-Bukata, D; Carter Wilkie, F

Second Team All-Atlantic Hockey

2006–07: Brent Patry, D; Simon Lambert, F
2008–09: Bobby Raymond, F
2009–10: Andrew Favot, F
2010–11: Chris Saracino, D; Tyler Brenner, F
2011–12: Chris Haltigin, D; Michael Colavecchia, F
2014–15: Brady Norrish, D; Josh Mitchell, D
2016–17: Brady Norrish, D
2018–19: Abbott Girduckis, F
2019–20: Adam Brubacher, D

Third Team All-Atlantic Hockey

2006–07: Louis Menard, G; Al Mazur, D
2007–08: Bobby Raymond, D
2008–09: Al Mazur, D
2009–10: Christopher Tanev, D; Cameron Burt, F
2010–11: Andrew Favot, F
2014–15: Alexander Kuqali, D; Brad McGowan, F
2015–16: Brady Norrish, D; Josh Mitchell, F
2017–18: Chase Norrish, D
2018–19: Adam Brubacher, D; Erik Brown, F
2019–20: Logan Drackett, G

Atlantic Hockey All-Rookie Team

2006–07: Louis Menard, G; Al Mazur, D; Anton Kharin, F
2008–09: Tyler Brenner, F
2009–10: Christopher Tanev, F
2014–15: Brady Norrish, F
2015–16: Gabriel Valenzuela, F
2016–17: Adam Brubacher, D
2019–20: Elijiah Gonsalves, F
2021–22: Tommy Scarfone, G; Carter Wilkie, F

School records

RIT Tigers Hall of Fame
The following is a list of people associated with the RIT men's ice hockey program who were elected into the RIT Tigers Hall of Fame (induction date in parenthesis).

1982–83 Team (2018)
1984–85 Team (2018)
William Bjorness (1999)
Mike Bournazakis (2015)
Scott Brown (1996)
Stephen Burns (2016)
Mark Dougherty (2016)
Tyler Euverman (2011)
Mark Gargiles (2015)
Chet Hallice (2010)
James Heffer (1991)
Ritchie Herbert (2006)
Simon Lambert (2014)
Dennis Lepley (1983)
Blaise MacDonald (1991)
Tom Masaschi (2008)
Chris Maybury (2007)
Jay Murphy (2001)
Chris Palmer (2005)
Dan Ringwald (2016)
Allan Shepard (2003)
Daryl Sullivan (1992)
Keith Vadas (1992)
Al Vyverberg (2012)
Len Williams (2004)

Tigers in the NHL
As of July 1, 2022.

Source:

See also 

 :Category:RIT Tigers men's ice hockey players
 RIT Tigers women's ice hockey

Notes

References
 
 : In the 2000s, school colors changed from Orange and Burnt Umber to Orange and Brown.

External links 
 

 
1958 establishments in New York (state)
Ice hockey clubs established in 1958